Vegusdal is a former municipality in the old Aust-Agder county in Norway. The  municipality existed from 1877 until its dissolution in 1967. It was located in the northwestern part of the present-day municipality of Birkenes in Agder county. The administrative centre of the municipality was the village of Engesland where Vegusdal Church is located. The Norwegian County Road 405 (Fv 405) runs through Vegusdal south to the village of Mosby in Vennesla.

History
The municipality was established on 1 January 1877 when the old municipality of Evje og Vegusdal was divided into Vegusdal (population: 935) in the east and Evje (population: 870) in the west. In 1900, the municipality had 985 inhabitants distributed among 141 farms. During the 1960s, there were many municipal mergers across Norway due to the work of the Schei Committee. On 1 January 1967, Vegusdal (population: 582) was merged with the neighboring municipalities of Birkenes (population: 1,883) and Herefoss (population: 585) to form a new, larger municipality of Birkenes.

Name
The municipality (originally the parish) of Vegusdal is named after the old Vegusdal farm. It is derived from the old male name,  meaning "weak " and the second part is the word  which means "valley" or "dale".

Government
The municipal council  of Vegusdal was made up of 13 representatives that were elected to four year terms.  The party breakdown of the final municipal council was as follows:

See also
List of former municipalities of Norway

References

External links

Map of the old municipality 

Birkenes
Former municipalities of Norway
1877 establishments in Norway
1967 disestablishments in Norway